Chosen Jacobs (born July 1, 2001) is an American actor and singer best known for his recurring role as Will Grover on the CBS television series Hawaii Five-0 and his role as Mike Hanlon in the 2017 film adaptation of the Stephen King novel It, and its follow-up It Chapter Two.

Life and career
Jacobs was born in Springfield, Massachusetts, but moved at a young age to Atlanta, where he was raised. He got his name from when his father heard a baby say something that sounded like "chosen." Jacobs started off as a musician, singing and playing the guitar and piano. He started acting when his mother enrolled him in theater classes. His first acting role was in a commercial for Hot Wheels. In 2015, he moved to Hollywood to further his music and acting career.

Filmography

Films

Television

Awards and nominations

 Endless Mountains Film Festival
 2016 — Award for Best Supporting Actor in a Movie — Remnants (Won)
 2018 — MTV Movie Award for Best On-Screen Team (with Finn Wolfhard, Sophia Lillis, Jaeden Lieberher, Jack Dylan Grazer, Wyatt Oleff and Jeremy Ray Taylor) (Won)

References

External links
 

2001 births
Living people
21st-century African-American people
21st-century American male actors
Actors from Springfield, Massachusetts
African-American male child actors
American male child actors
American male film actors
American male television actors